Janusz Gąsiorowski (1889-1949; born in Lemberg) was a Polish general, commander of the Polish 7th Infantry Division during the German invasion of Poland in 1939. Taken prisoner on 4 September in the battle of Częstochowa. He was awarded the Serbian Order of Saint Sava and a number of other decorations.

References

1889 births
1949 deaths
Recipients of the Order of St. Sava
Military personnel from Lviv
Polish generals of the Second Polish Republic
Polish September Campaign participants